Susie Garrett (December 29, 1929 – May 24, 2002) was an American actress of theatre and television, jazz vocalist and acting teacher. She is best known for playing Cherie's grandmother Betty Johnson on the NBC series Punky Brewster.

Personal life
Garrett had an associate degree in psychology from Shaw College at Detroit. She was the mother of four sons, and the older sister of Marla Gibbs. Together, Garrett and Gibbs co-founded the Crossroads Art Academy acting school in Los Angeles.

Career
Born in Detroit in 1929, she sang jazz at clubs in the city. She starred in such plays as Dark of the Moon and Shakin' the Mess Out of Misery, and had a small part in the 1989 film Wicked Stepmother.

Aside from Punky Brewster, she had guest starred on her sister's TV series The Jeffersons and 227.

Death
In 2002, Garrett died of cancer at Providence Hospital in Southfield, Michigan, at the age of 72. She is interred at Woodlawn Cemetery, which incorrectly lists her birth year as 1931.

Filmography

References

External links

 
 

1929 births
2002 deaths
Actresses from Michigan
Singers from Detroit
Deaths from cancer in Michigan
20th-century African-American women singers
20th-century American actresses
African-American actresses
American television actresses
American film actresses
American stage actresses
Acting teachers
20th-century American singers
Burials at Woodlawn Cemetery (Detroit)
20th-century American women singers
21st-century African-American people
21st-century African-American women